Percy Harris is the name of:

Percy Harris (lawyer), British barrister
Percy Harris (politician), British politician

See also
Percy Harris Bowers, Anglican priest
Percy Harrison (disambiguation)